Künzelsau (East Franconian: Kinzelse) is a town in Baden-Württemberg, in south central Germany. It is the capital of the Hohenlohe district. It is located on the river Kocher, 19 km (12 mi) north of Schwäbisch Hall, and 37 km (23 mi) northeast of Heilbronn.

Geography 
The city of Künzelsau is located, at elevation , along the Kocher River, a right tributary of the Neckar River, some 40 km east (25 mi) of Heilbronn. The city is, after Öhringen, the second largest city of the Hohenlohe district, whose seat it is.

The Hohenlohe district was created on 1 January 1973 by merging the former districts of Künzelsau (KÜN) and Öhringen (ÖHR). The city of Künzelsau thus retained being the district seat, so that the license plate number still uses KÜN. Künzelsau is one of seven centers in the region Heilbronn-Franken within the administrative district of Stuttgart.

City arrangement
The city of Künzelsau is located in the valley (elevation 218 m) and is surrounded by the higher-lying towns: Amrichshausen (401 m), Belsenberg (256 m) (with the parts Rodachshof and Siegelhof), Gaisbach (381 m) (with the hamlets Etzlinsweiler, Haag, Kemmeten, Oberhof, Unterhof and Weckhof and the farmstead Schnaihof), Garnberg (404 m), Kocherstetten (254 m) (with hamlet Schloß Stetten and farmsteads Bienenhof and Buchenmühle), Laßbach (with villages Mäusdorf and Vogelsberg and 3 farmsteads Falkenhof, Kügelhof and Rappoldsweiler Hof) (435 m), Morsbach (223 m), Nagelsberg (312 m), Nitzenhausen (431 m) (with hamlets Berndshausen and Sonnhofen), Ohrenbach (430 m), Steinbach (412 m) (with 3 hamlets Büttelbronn, Ohrenbach and Wolfsölden) - the data in each case in meters above sea level. Belonging to Künzelsau before the municipal reform of the 1970s were: the city Künzelsau, the villages of Garnberg and Nagelberg, and residential places Gaisbacher Rank and Hofratsmühle.

In the urban area of Künzelsau are several assigned areas (to former municipalities assigned): Neugreut to Amrichshausen, chapel of the Holy Cross to Belsenberg, Hefenhofen, Herborten, Steinbach, Gackstatt and Schupperg to Gaisbach, Baldehofen, Kronhofen, Webern, Wartturm of the Burg Zarge to Künzelsau, Alosweiler, Bole oder Bohel, Hitels (in Vogelsberg), Schätzlinshof and Schlothof to Laßbach, the named Heidenschlößchen to Morsbach, as well as Holderbach, Dörrenhof, Klingen and Wilhelmshaus to Steinbach
[2].

The district area is 75.17 km, including all parts of the city square.

History

It was first documented in the year 1098 as Künzelsau. Until 1802, the city was under a Ganerbengemeinschaft, which consisted of a varying number of members. In 1806 Künzelsau along with the Principality of Hohenlohe was joined to the Kingdom of Württemberg. In 1811 Künzelsau became the seat of the higher administrative division of the same name (since 1938: Künzelsau District). In 1892, the railway station was inaugurated in Künzelsau.

Künzelsau was, in the late 18th and early 19th century, the centre point of emigration to the UK of pork butchers. The pioneers noticed a niche for speciality pork products in the rapidly growing English cities, especially those in the industrial north. Most married local women, but sent word home that a good living could be made in England, and others followed.

In 1948, L. Hermann clothes factory (now the Mustang apparel Werke GmbH + Co. KG), produced the first jeans in Germany.

In 1973, with the district reform, the former county seat of the district Künzelsau, became county seat of the new Hohenlohe district, which includes the old-district Öhringen and a small part of the old-district Buchen.

Religions
The Protestant Reformation was introduced to Künzelsau in 1556. The city is therefore predominantly Protestant. Since the move here from Ingelfingen in 1824/25, it has been the seat of the deanery of the Evangelical Lutheran Church in Württemberg (see Church District Künzelsau). Evangelical congregations can be found in Belsenberg, Kocherstetten, Künzelsau and Morsbach, which include most Protestants from the other districts. Only the Protestants of the districts Berndshausen, Nitzenhausen and Wolf Sölden belong to the church community Buchenbach (community Mulfingen).

The formerly independent Catholic parishes of Künzelsau, Nagelsberg, Kupferzell and Amrichshausen have been combined to the pastoral care unit of Künzelsau.

Besides the two large churches in Künzelsau, there exist a New Apostolic Church (with churches in Künzelsau Gaisbach), a congregation of Jehovah's Witnesses (Kingdom Hall in Gaisbach), a Greek Orthodox church, the Pentecostal-charismatic missionary community committed Christian from the Federation of Pentecostal Churches, and other Christian denominations.

After the entry of Jews in the 14th century, and evidence of a historic Jewish cemetery in Künzelsau created a modern Jewish community in Künzelsau until the late 19th century, especially by the influx of Jews from Nagelberg. The Jewish community was first called "Nagelberg-Künzelsau", then "Künzelsau-Nagelberg" and finally from 1900 as "Künzelsau", thus the name of the walk Nagelberg to Künzelsau is documented. In 1907, the Künzelsau synagogue was opened, which was destroyed during the November Pogrom of 1938.[3]

The town became extinct during the persecution of Jews at the time of National Socialism. Some community members were able to emigrate, but the majority came in the course of the deportation of German Jews to death camps. Only the merchant Sigbert Baer outlasted the time of the Third Reich in Künzelsau.

Population development

Annexations
 1 April 1912: Garnberg
 1 October 1937: Nagelsberg
 1 January 1972: Amrichshausen, Belsenberg, Kocherstetten, Laßbach, Nitzenhausen and Steinbach
 1 April 1972: Gaisbach
 1 January 1973: Morsbach
 1 January 1977: Ort Sonnhofen

Politics

Town council 
The Kommunalwahl for 2009 had the following seats, as percentages in the town council:

Through the abolition of loggerheads in local elections, the council was reduced from 34 to 26 seats.

Mayor
The mayor is directly elected for eight years. In the 2010 election, Stefan Neumann won. He replaced Volker Lenz on 1 September 2010, who had served since 1986.

Coat of arms and flag

The blazon of Kuenzel Auer coat of arms is: on an azure background, a silver plate, with the bearded golden head of John the Baptist. The city flag is blue and white.

The severed head of John the Baptist, Patron of the Church of Künzelsau, was first used on seals of Künzelsau starting in 1525. The colors of the flag were probably set in the 18th or 19th century.

Sister cities
Künzelsau has, since 1992, developed partnerships with the city Marcali in Hungary.

Economy and infrastructure

Transport
The main traffic artery of Künzelsau is federal highway B 19, which comes from the northern town of Bad Mergentheim through the Künzelsau district of Nagelberg to the Kocher, crosses Künzelsau, climbs out of the valley leaves again and then runs via Künzelsau-south towards Schwäbisch Hall and Gaildorf. In the southern neighboring community of Kupferzell, the B 19 connects to the Autobahn A 6 to Heilbronn to the west and to Nuremberg to the east. Künzelsau is connected by state and district roads with the places in the Kocher valley and the surrounding plateaus.

Künzelsau is no longer connected to the railway network. The city had acquired a connection to the rail system in 1892. When the Royal Württemberg State Railways opened the Kocher Valley Railway from Waldenburg to Künzelsau, it also built a station in Haag with a type I entrance building. The line was extended to Forchtenberg in 1924, giving Nagelberg a railway connection. In 1981, passenger services to Hohenlohe were closed in 1991, and this was followed by total closure of the line. Much of the former railway line was converted to a paved bike path that leads up to the level of Hohenlohe. As the end of 2008, it was announced that reopening of the railway section between Künzelsau and Waldenburg was being examined as part of the Heilbronn Stadtbahn.

Since 1999, in town, the Künzelsauer Bergbahn funicular railway has connected the main housing Taläcker in the Hohenlohe level with the core city Kocher.

Local businesses
Künzelsau is home to several global companies of the sectors assembly parts (distributors), ventilation systems, support equipment, textiles (jeans), and a restorer of Italian classic vespa scooters.

 Berner AG, supplies and tools for industry and trade
 Mustang apparel Werke GmbH + Co. KG
 P + V GmbH, precision and connection technology
 Rosenberg GmbH, Ventilation/Air Conditioning/Fan Manufacture
 STAHL GmbH, conveying
 Vespa Classico, Classic Vespa Scooter Restorations, Belsenberg
 Würth Group, Assembly Technology
 ZIEHL-ABEGG SE Drive, fans and control technology.
 Veigel Automotive Veigel develops and produces Dual Controls and Rehamotive® driving aids for customers in Germany and all over the world
The savings bank of Hohenlohe district is based in Künzelsau, and Volksbank Hohenlohe here operates a main office. In addition, other national banks maintain branches in Künzelsau.

Viticulture
In Künzelsau, wine production is operated on a small scale. The local region belongs to the main region Kocherberg in the Jagst-Kocher-Tauber area. A few have Belsenberg with the plan of Heilig Kreuz.

Courts and agencies
Künzelsau has a district court, which belongs to the District Court of Heilbronn and the Higher Regional Court of Stuttgart.

The city is home to the church district Künzelsau, the Evangelical Lutheran Church in Württemberg, and the Hohenlohe deanery of Rottenburg-Stuttgart.

The fire department of Künzelsau acts as base for firefighters in their surrounding communities Ingelfingen, Kupferzell, Mulfingen, Niedernhall and Weißbach, as well as the Hohenlohe industrial park in Waldenburg. It provides for large fires on the plan and has major technical assistance. In addition, it provides special services for the entire Hohenlohe district.

Education

Outside the city-limits of Künzelsau, since 1988 a branch of the University of Heilbronn is located in the district of Hofratsmühle, comprising the departments of electrical engineering, industrial engineering, business studies and media, product, customer management, business administration, sports, cultural and leisure-time management, and since the winter semester 2007/2008, of energy management. About 1300 students (SS 06) study here at the present. In 2005, the college was renamed the Reinhold Würth University of the University of Heilbronn.

The city of Künzelsau is the provider of basic and secondary school in Künzelsau. There are four primary schools in the districts Amrichshausen, Gaisbach (Reinhold-Würth-Schule), Kocherstetten und Taläcker, Georg-Wagner-secondary school, the Brothers Grimm School (special school) and Ganerben-Gymnasium. The Hohenlohe district has been awarded the Geschwister-Scholl-Schule (school for mentally disabled), the Erich-Kästner-Schule (school for speech impaired) and the three professional schools: Gewerbliche Schule, Kaufmännische Schule and Hauswirtschaftliche Schule (Karoline-Breitinger-Schule).

The state of Baden-Württemberg became recipient of the Schloss-gymnasium, a postgraduate school with boarding. There is also a public high school and a youth music school.

The Würth Group, in the school year 2006/2007, opened a private school named Freie Schule Anne-Sophie (named after a childhood deceased daughter of Bettina Würth). The full-day operation will be taught students in grades one through eight. An extension to the class ten is provided. In the section Taläcker, during the 2008/2009 school year, a private school operated.

Sports and leisure facilities
The Kocher is the only river open for swimming in Baden-Wuerttemberg. The sports facilities in "Prübling" offer the sports stadium, a barn, tennis courts and gym. Soccer fields are located in different areas. On the southwestern ridge of Künzelsau, near the residential area got its fair, there are fitness and nature trails.

Culture and sights

Museums
The Würth Museum in the district and the Gaisbach Hirschwirtscheuer in the city are devoted to contemporary art. The Hohenlohe Art Association also operates an art gallery since November 2008 at the Kocher bridge.
In 2007 was the 75th anniversary of a museum for the future of the Mustang apparel Werke GmbH & Co. KG was established in Founders House.

Structures
The Old Town Hall from the 16th century was built on the Künsbach.

Located at Keltergasse 63 is the home of the writer Hermann Lenz. The building dates from the 18th century.

Youth facilities
At the old train station is the youth cultural-society Kokolores.  Other rooms in the same building are used by the Youth Council Künzelsau and a branch of the music school.  Near the fire station of Künzelsau is the Jugendzentrum (youth center). In the town section Taläcker, there is a youth block house.

Notable residents
 Johann Heinrich Schüle (1720–1811), inventor
 Karl Hirzel (1808–1874), classical philosopher
 Adolf Hirzel (1809–1898), politician
 August Beyer (1834–1899), master builder
 Karoline Breitinger (1851–1932), first female doctor of Württembergs
 Wilhelm Schmid (1859–1951), classical philosopher
 Georg Albrecht (1881–1964), historian
 Georg Wagner (1885–1972), geologist
 Hermann Lenz (1913–1998), writer, poet
 Walter Haeussermann (1914–2010), aerospace engineer, Team Wernher von Braun
 Albert Berner (born 1935), founder of Albert Berner GmbH
 Reinhold Würth (born 1935), Owner of Würth
 Hans Wall (born 1942), founder of Wall AG
 Eberhard Gienger (born 1951), world champion in stretching gymnastics and German politician (CDU), member of the Bundestag
 Alexander Gerst (born 1976), geophysicist and ESA astronaut
Valentin Abel (born 1991), Member of the Bundestag

References 

Hohenlohe (district)
Holocaust locations in Germany
Württemberg